The men's 100 metre butterfly competition of the swimming events at the 1983 Pan American Games took place on 18 August. The last Pan American Games champion was Robert Placak of US.

This race consisted of two lengths of the pool, all in butterfly.

Results
All times are in minutes and seconds.

Heats

Final 
The final was held on August 18.

References

Swimming at the 1983 Pan American Games